"Scots Wha Hae" (English: Scots Who Have) is a patriotic song of Scotland written using both words of the Scots language and English, which served for centuries as an unofficial national anthem of the country, but has lately been largely supplanted by "Scotland the Brave" and "Flower of Scotland".

Background 
The lyrics were written by Robert Burns in 1793, in the form of a speech given by Robert the Bruce before the Battle of Bannockburn in 1314, where Scotland maintained its sovereignty from the Kingdom of England. Although the lyrics are by Burns, he wrote them to the traditional Scottish tune "Hey Tuttie Tatie", which according to tradition, was played by Bruce's army at the Battle of Bannockburn.

According to tradition, the same theme was played in 1429 by the Franco-Scots army at the Siege of Orleans in front of Jeanne d'Arc. The song, called "Marche des soldats de Robert Bruce" in France, belongs to the traditional list of military music, and commemorates the long-lasting Auld alliance between France and Scotland. As for the Battle of Bannockburn, the theme really played was probably a traditional Scottish theme such as "Hey Tuttie Tatie". 

The tune tends to be played as a slow air, but certain arrangements put it at a faster tempo, as in the Scottish Fantasy by Max Bruch, the concert overture Rob Roy by Hector Berlioz, and the Real McKenzies' punk rock rendition on their 1998 album Clash of the Tartans.

The song was sent by Burns to his publisher, George Thomson, at the end of August 1793, with the title "Robert Bruce's March To Bannockburn", and a postscript saying that he had been inspired by Bruce's "glorious struggle for Freedom, associated with the glowing ideas of some other struggles of the same nature, not quite so ancient." This is seen as a covert reference to the Radical movement, and particularly to the trial of Glasgow lawyer Thomas Muir of Huntershill, whose trial began on 30 August 1793 as part of a British government crackdown, after the French Revolutionary Wars led to France declaring war on the Kingdom of Great Britain on 1 February 1793.

Muir was accused of sedition for allegedly inciting the Scottish people to oppose the government during the December 1792 convention of the Scottish Friends of the People Society, and was eventually sentenced to 14 years' transportation to the convict settlement at Botany Bay, Australia.

Burns was aware that if he declared his Republican and Radical sympathies openly, he could suffer the same fate. When Burns notably agreed to let the Morning Chronicle, of 8 May 1794, publish the song, it was on the basis of "let them insert it as a thing they have met with by accident, and unknown to me."

The song was included in the 1799 edition of A Select Collection of Original Scottish Airs for the Voice, edited by George Thomson, but Thomson preferred the tune "Lewie Gordon", and had Burns add to the fourth line of each stanza, to suit. In the 1802 edition, the original words and tune were restored.

In 1881, the New York Times, reviewing Our Familiar Songs and Those Who Made Them by Helen Kendrick Johnson, asserted that  no song was "more glorious" than "", explaining that once Burns' poem had been set to the tune of Hey Tuttie Tatie, it "marched through the land forever, loud, and triumphant."

"Scots Wha Hae" is the party song of the Scottish National Party. In the past, it was sung at the close of their annual national conference each year.

The tune is also featured in the fourth movement of the Scottish Fantasy, composed in 1880 by German composer Max Bruch .

Lyrics

In popular culture
 The opening lyrics of the song are the key words for the posthypnotic-suggestion programming of United Nations Exploratory Force soldiers in Joe Haldeman's military science-fiction novel The Forever War, intended to make them particularly aggressive in battle.
 In the Dad's Army episode "My British Buddy", Private Frazer recites a personally updated version of the song's second and third lyrics to an American colonel during the welcoming of the United States into World War II.

References

Bold, Alan (editor), Rhymer Rab, An Anthology of Poems and Prose by Robert Burns, Black Swan, Transworld Publishers Ltd, London 1993, 
Mackay, James A. (editor), The Complete Letters of Robert Burns, Ayr 1987.

External links
Digitised copy of Scots Wha Hae in James Johnson's Scots Musical Museum, printed between 1787 and 1803, from National Library of Scotland. JPEG, PDF, XML versions.
 MP3 file of vocal performance

Scottish patriotic songs
Political party songs
Poetry by Robert Burns
Scots-language works
Scottish National Party
1790s songs
Scottish literature
Traditional ballads
William Wallace
1793 works
1793 in Scotland
European anthems
Robert the Bruce